Hugh IV may refer to:

Hugh IV of Lusignan (died c. 1026)
Hugh IV, Count of Maine (died 1051)
Hugh IV, Viscount of Châteaudun (died 1110)
Hugh IV, Count of Saint-Pol (died 1205)
Hugh IV of Rodez (c. 1212–1274)
Hugh IV, Duke of Burgundy (1213–1272)
Hugh IV, Count of Rethel (1244–1285)
Hugh IV, Count of Angoulême (1259–1303), a.k.a. Hugh XIII of Lusignan
Hugh IV of Cyprus (1293 to 1296–1359)